|}

The Berkshire Novices' Chase is a Grade 2 National Hunt chase in Great Britain which is open to horses aged four years or older. It is run at Newbury, Berkshire, over a distance of about 2 miles and 4 furlongs (2 miles 3 furlongs and 187 yards, or 4,367 metres), and during its running there are sixteen fences to be jumped. The race is for novice chasers, and it is scheduled to take place each year in late November or early December.

Prior to 1991 the event was known as the Hopeful Chase, but was then renamed as the Fulke Walwyn Novices' Chase, in memory of the racehorse trainer Fulke Walwyn. It attained Listed status in 2001, and it was promoted to Grade 2 level in 2004. The race was given its present title in 2006. From 2011 to 2016 the race was sponsored by Fuller's Brewery and run as the Fuller's London Pride Novices' Chase. Since 2017 it has been sponsored by Ladbrokes.

Records
Leading jockey since 1987 (4 wins):
 Barry Geraghty – The Market Man (2008), Punchestowns (2009), Bobs Worth (2011), Champ (2019)

Leading trainer since 1987 (8 wins):
 Nicky Henderson – Remittance Man (1990), Bacchanal (2000), Katarino (2001), The Market Man (2008), Punchestowns (2009), Bobs Worth (2011), Champ (2019), Caribean Boy (2020)

Winners since 1987

See also
 Horse racing in Great Britain
 List of British National Hunt races

References
 Racing Post:
 pedigreequery.com – Berkshire Novices' Chase – Newbury.

National Hunt races in Great Britain
Newbury Racecourse
National Hunt chases